National Law Universities (NLU) are public law schools in India, founded pursuant to the second-generation reforms for legal education sought to be implemented by the Bar Council of India.  The first NLU was the National Law School of India University aka NLU Bangalore which admitted its first batch in 1988. Since then, most of the states in India have established NLUs. Currently there are 23 active NLUs across the country. Since their inception, these law schools have continuously been ranked as India's most prestigious and premier law schools by various agencies, they are also known as the IITs of Legal Education .The admissions to these universities is conducted through the Common Law Admission Test (CLAT) except in the case of National Law University, Delhi, which admits students through its All India Law Entrance Test (AILET). Admission to the NLUs is extremely competitive with an acceptance rate as low as of 2% to 3%.

History 
Traditionally legal education in India was conducted through the medium of non-specalized universities of India which granted law degrees like any other graduate degree. These universities referred and taught the curriculum prescribed by the Bar Council of India, but since they were under the overall control and supervision of the University Grants Commission, therefore it was not possible for the Bar Council to effectively pursue reforms in legal education.

This system continued for more than two decades with the overall legal education supervision by the Bar Council, since its establishment in terms of the Advocates Act, 1961. However, there were calls for reforms from all quarters of the country in general because of the falling standards of the bar and there were mounting pressures over the Bar Council of India to change the way legal education was imparted in India.

The first concrete decision to this end was taken in 1984 when various proposals to modernize legal education were considered and approved by the Legal Education Committee of the Bar Council, in an attempt to improve legal education throughout India. One major proposal was the decision to establish specialized institutions to impart legal education in an integrated and diversified manner. The aim was to revitalize the legal profession by making law an attractive profession and making it competitive to attract talent, which was hitherto diverted to other professional areas such as medicine and engineering.

Structure 
In contrast with the existing pattern of legal education in India, the proposed autonomous law schools varied in structural design and in various other respects. Some of these can be identified through the characteristics they carry:
 Autonomous status of the law schools: This implied that the law schools carried either a 'deemed university' or a 'university' status, which empowered them to grant their own degree and which was recognized by other institutions in terms of the University Grants Commission regulations.
 Five year law programme: Earlier law degrees were granted only to those candidates who had already completed their graduation and after three years of formal legal education. However, the admission to these autonomous law schools were only to those candidates who had completed Grade 12.
 Integrated degrees: In these autonomous law schools, students studied for a law degree in integration with another degree of their choice. This allowed prospective advocates to have understanding of areas other than law. It also compensated for the lack of three years of formal education of other subjects that candidates in traditional three year law degree programme carried. Initially the choice of second degree was confined to B.A. (Bachelor of Arts). Later, other choices were also offered like B.Sc. (Bachelor of Science), B.B.A. (Bachelor of Business Administration) and B.Com. (Bachelor of Commerce).
 Intensive legal education: These law schools were given autonomy to devise the imparting of the curriculum in a manner which would best suit the candidate's ability to understand legal concepts and ability to appreciate various issues involved in legal setting and instill in them the merit and reasoning standards required for a high professional conducts. A standout feature of these institutions is that they are single subject universities where the main thrust of education is on law with other complementary social sciences.
 National status of law schools: These Schools are recognized by the university grants commission as "state universities" and are affiliated to the Bar Council of India. Each of these law schools were to be established under a specific legislation, to be passed by the State legislature of the State desirous of establishing a law school. In terms of these legislation, these law schools were required to establish and practice excellent and high standards, at par with other national level institutions imparting education in other wakes of social life. The conferment of national status also make admittance to these law schools at a prestigious choice and thus inviting meritorious students to get inclined to join legal profession.
 Involvement of legal luminaries: To improve standards of legal education and ensure education imparted in these institutions met desired standards, the Bar Council of India involved various prestigious and talented individuals with these law schools. The most notable of these was the involvement of highly placed constitutional functionaries, such as the Chief Justice of India or the Chief Justice of various High Courts as the "Visitors" and often "Chancellors" of these law schools, which implied a constant involvement and supervision of elite figures of legal profession in India with these law schools.

List of National Law Universities [NLUs]

See also 
 Legal education in India
 Army Institute of Law
 List of law schools in India

Notes

References 

 

Legal education in India